Bilohiria (translit. Bilohir'ia) (formerly known as Liakhivtsi) is an urban-type settlement in Shepetivka Raion, Khmelnytskyi Oblast of western Ukraine. It hosts the administration of Bilohiria settlement hromada, one of the hromadas of Ukraine. The settlement's population was 5,592 as of the 2001 Ukrainian Census and  Nearby urban localities include Yampil (formerly Yampol or Iampol), Kremenets, and Kornytsya.

The town is located on the banks of the Horyn River, a tributary of the Prypyat. The town of Bilohiria also administers the Bilohiria Settlement Council, whose jurisdiction also covers the villages of Karasykha and Trostianka.

History
The region surrounding Liakhivtsi was known to be settled by at least the 12th century, when residents of the Kyiv area migrated west to Volhynia and beyond. The Mongol invasion of 1260 subjected the area to rule of the Mongol khan. Lithuanian control over the region took place in the 14th century. The settlement of Liakhivtsi was founded in 1441 on Bilohiria's modern-day territory. Jews were expelled from the region in 1495, but were allowed to return a few years later. The settlement received the Magdeburg rights in 1583.

Polish influence increased over the 15th and 16th centuries, with Poland taking official control in 1569 with the Treaty of Lublin. Cultural life in Volhynia flourished under Polish rule, interrupted by the 1648 Chmielnicki Khmelnytsky Uprising massacres, which killed many Jewish residents. Additional settlements formed in the 1660s. Volhynia was transferred to Polish control in 1793, where it remained until the interwar period.

In 1885, Liakhivtsi was the administrative center of the Liakhivtsi volost of the Ostroh povit. During that time, the settlement's population consisted of 2,368.

The Russian Empire Census of 1897 reported the town's population as 5,401. At that time, 3,890 of the inhabitants belonged to the Eastern Orthodox faith, while 1,384 were of the Jewish faith.

In the 20th century, the region was populated by both ethnic Ukrainians and Poles, whose populations struggled against each other. At the same time, Germany and the Soviet Union that were struggling for influence in the greater region. World War II brought these conflicts to the forefront. Nazi Germany occupied the region in June 1941. World War II ended in tragedy for the Jews of Lechowitz. German forces invaded Russia in June 1941, and within a year, murdered virtually the entire Jewish population of Lechowitz. A memorial  exists today in the forests outside of town, where 2,300 Jews from Lechowitz and nearby towns were murdered by German forces. A small number of Jews from Lechowitz survived World War II.

The entire region fell under Soviet rule following the end of World War II. In August 1991, Ukraine became an independent state, and Lechowitz (Bilohiria) is part of that state.

The town was known by the name of Liakhivtsi (Lechowitz, Lyakhovtsy, Lechevitz, Lakhovce, Liakhovitz, etc.) until it was changed in 1949 when its status was upgraded to that of a rural settlement. In 1960, Bilohiria received the status of an urban-type settlement. The Yiddish version of the town name was לעחיוויץ. After World War II, the Russian government renamed the town to Belogor'ye or Belogoria. The Ukrainian version of the name is Bilohir'ya or Bilohiria.

There are other towns named  Liakhivtsi(or phonetically similar), including one in called Lyakhavichy in Belarus, a town called Lachowice in Poland, and one called Lechotice in the Czech Republic.

Until 18 July 2020, Bilohiria was the administrative center of Bilohiria Raion. The raion was abolished in July 2020 as part of the administrative reform of Ukraine, which reduced the number of raions of Khmelnytskyi Oblast to three. The area of Bilohiria Raion was merged into Shepetivka Raion.

See also
 Yampil, the other urban-type settlement in the Bilohiria Raion

References

External links
 

Urban-type settlements in Shepetivka Raion
Populated places established in the 1440s
Volhynian Voivodeship (1569–1795)
Ostrozhsky Uyezd